Irumbu Thirai may refer to:
 Irumbu Thirai (1960 film), an Indian Tamil-language film
 Irumbu Thirai (2018 film), an Indian Tamil-language film